Ambush Makeover is a television show which aired in syndication and the Discovery Channel from 2004–2005.  The show aired on Fox-owned stations during its first season, and then went national for the second season before being cancelled by Discovery Channel. Reruns can be currently seen on the Ion Life channel.

Overview
Each episode follows a regular outline:
 Style Agent Intro - There are a number of "style agents" that act as the host and present ideas for the makeover of an individual. The agents are well dressed and hip to the local fashion scenes they invade. The agents's names are:  Anthony Perinelli (season 2), Mary Alice Haney, Gigi Berry, Nancy Brensson, Nicole Williams, William Whatley (all from seasons 1-2), and Rob Talty (season 1).
 Search - The host is on the streets of a large city and is looking for a target which is sporting a bad hairdo, old fashion, etc. The host tells the target how bad they look. Some targets reject this opportunity to be on the show.
 Salon Intro - The target is walked to a salon and meets the team that will work on him/her. Each member tells the camera what they are planning to do with the target.
 Coloring - Most episodes include a part in which the target is given a new hair color.
 Outfit Shopping - The host takes the target to a boutique and tries on a variety on outfits that might be suitable for the event that evening. This involves negotiation between the target and style agent.
 Final Cut, Makeup - The target is given the finishing touches to his/her makeover. This includes the haircut and if in the case of a female target makeup is also done.
 Results Revealed - The target is shown the results of their makeover. Most are comfortable with their new look and thank the salon crew and the agent.
 Event - The target is taken to the event held especially for them. The guests are asked to close their eyes before getting the surprise of the targets makeover. A close relative speaks to the camera about their loved ones makeover.

2000s American reality television series
First-run syndicated television programs in the United States
2004 American television series debuts
2005 American television series endings
Makeover reality television series
Fashion-themed reality television series
Discovery Channel original programming
Television series by 20th Century Fox Television